2000FM (call sign 2OOO) is a multilingual community radio station broadcasting to Sydney in languages other than English from studios in the suburb of Burwood. It is a volunteer run organisation and is funded through listener support, grants and limited commercial sponsorship.

The mission of 2000FM is to provide a service through dedication to enrich the cohesion of our cultural diversity via tolerance, understanding and respect for each other.

History

2000FM was established in 1992.  It was granted a licence by the Australian Communications and Media Authority and commenced broadcasting in 1994.

Programming

As of 2008, the station broadcasts in the following languages:

Afghan
Albanian
Arabic
Armenian
Assyrian
Azerbaijani
Bengali
Bosnian
Burmese
Cantonese
Cook Island Maori
Croatian
Fijian
Filipino
Akan (Ghana)
Greek
Hindi
Hungarian
Indonesian
Irish Celtic
Italian
Korean
Kurdish
Macedonian
Mandarin
Marathi
Persian
Polish
Punjabi
Russian
Samoan
Serbian
Sinhalese
Spanish
Sudanese
Tamil
Telugu
Thai
Timorese
Tongan
Turkmen
Ukrainian
Urdu
Vietnamese

2000FM also features other community access broadcasts including specific youth programs in some of the languages above, a weekly fashion and design show and Feathered Friends a program for bird fanciers.

HRR 98.5FM is a hard rock/heavy metal program on radio broadcasting from the studio of 2000FM.  It first aired on 13 April 2008.

See also
List of radio stations in Australia
National Ethnic and Multicultural Broadcasters Council

References

External links

Radio stations in Sydney
Community radio stations in Australia
2OOO
Ethnic radio stations in Australia